Yonggu may refer to:

 Yonggu, Guangdong, a town in Guangdong County, China
 Yonggu Mausoleum, the mausoleum of Empress Feng (442–490), in Shanxi Province, China